UFO for solo percussion and orchestra (1999) and for solo percussion and symphonic band (2000) by American composer Michael Daugherty, is a composition written for percussionist Evelyn Glennie.

The world of American pop culture inspires much of Daugherty's music, in the present case, the unidentified flying objects that have been an obsession in American popular culture since 1947 .

History
UFO for solo percussion and orchestra was commissioned by the National Symphony Orchestra through a grant from the John and June Hechinger Commissioning Fund.  It was first performed by Evelyn Glennie and the National Symphony Orchestra conducted by Leonard Slatkin at the Kennedy Center, Washington D.C. on April 10, 1999. In 2000, on a commission from Michigan State University, the University of Michigan, Baylor University, the Arizona State University, and the University of North Texas, Daugherty adapted the orchestral part for symphonic band. This version was premiered by the Michigan State University Symphony Band conducted by John Whitwell, with solo percussionist Allison Shaw, on October 7, 2000, at Michigan State University, East Lansing, Michigan , and by Evelyn Glennie, solo percussion and the North Texas Wind Symphony conducted by Eugene Migliaro Corporon on April 19, 2001 in Denton, Texas.

Instrumentation
In five movements with a total duration of about 40 minutes, the concerto is scored for piccolo, 2 flutes, 2 oboes, English horn, B clarinet, E clarinet, bass clarinet, 2 bassoons, contrabassoon, 4 horns, 4 trumpets, 3 trombones, tuba, and strings.

The symphonic band version is scored for piccolo, 4 flutes, 2 oboes, English horn, E clarinet, 4 B clarinets, bass clarinet, 2 bassoons, contrabassoon, soprano, alto, tenor, and baritone saxophones, 4 horns, 4 trumpets, 2 trombones, bass trombone, 3 euphoniums, 2 tubas, and contrabass.

Movements 
 Traveling Music
 Unidentified
 Flying
 ???
 Objects

Discography 
 American Classics - Michael Daugherty: Philadelphia Stories/UFO for solo percussion and orchestra 
Evelyn Glennie - solo percussion
Colorado Symphony Orchestra, Marin Alsop, Conductor
 UFO - Music of Michael Daugherty: Desi/Motown Metal/Niagara Falls/Red Cape Tango/UFO for solo percussion and symphony band 
Evelyn Glennie - solo percussion
North Texas Wind Symphony, Eugene Migliaro Corporon, Conductor

References

 
 Program notes from Naxos recording
 Official site of Michael Daugherty
 UFO for solo percussion and orchestra (1999)
 UFO for solo percussion and symphonic band (2000)

Concertos by Michael Daugherty
1999 compositions
Percussion concertos
Concert band pieces
Music commissioned by the National Symphony Orchestra